American Tortoise Rescue (ATR) is an animal rescue organization dedicated to the rescue, rehabilitation, adoption and protection of all tortoise and turtle species, and the protection of their environments.  Located in Malibu, California, ATR is a United States 501(c)(3) nonprofit corporation.

Since its founding in 1990 by husband and wife team Marshall Thompson and Susan Tellem, ATR has rescued over 1,000 turtles and 2,000 tortoises. The organization's in-house population "floats" at about 125 animals.

World Turtle Day
Beginning in 2000, ATR sponsored World Turtle Day in an effort to increase awareness of the plight of turtles and tortoises and the environments that support them.

References

External links
American Tortoise Rescue

Tortoises
Turtles of North America
Animal welfare organizations based in the United States
Turtle conservation organizations
Environmental organizations based in California
Environmental organizations established in 1990
1990 establishments in California